Storekalsøy or Stora Kalsøy is an island in Austevoll municipality in Vestland county, Norway. The  island lies northwest of the larger island of Hundvåko and just east of the Marstein Lighthouse. The northern part of the island is very rocky and mountainous. The smaller islands of Nautøya and Spissøya lies just east of Stora Kalsøy. The smaller islands of Horgo, Møkster, and Litla Kalsøya lie to the south of Stora Kalsøy.

Virtually all the residents live along the southern and eastern coastline of the island.  The main population centre of Stora Kalsøy is the village of Bakkasund where the Store-Kalsøy Chapel is located. The island had 167 inhabitants in 2001.

See also
List of islands of Norway

References

Islands of Vestland
Austevoll